Rajya Sevaya Pinisai (On State Service) is a 2000 Sri Lankan Sinhala drama thriller film directed by Udayakantha Warnasuriya and produced by Ranjith Jayasuriya for Ureka Films. It stars Sanath Gunathilake and Geetha Kumarasinghe in lead roles along with Joe Abeywickrama and Kanchana Mendis. Music composed by Dilup Gabadamudalige.

The story is based on some true to life incidents that happened in Sri Lanka during 1987–1989 JVP insurrection.

Plot

Cast
 Sanath Gunathilake as Minister Janaka Situbandara
 Geetha Kumarasinghe as Mahesha Upamali
 Joe Abeywickrama as Sumanasekara 
 Kanchana Mendis as Prabhashwari
 Linton Semage as Wijepala
 Nimal Antony as Nihal
 Salaman Fonseka as Minister Welgama
 Nalin Pradeep Udawela as Janaka's henchman
 Priyankara Rathnayake as Janaka's shooter
 Jagath Benaragama as Dragged away shooter
 Sarath Chandrasiri as Purple shirt shooter
 Raja Sumanapala as Shot shopowner
 Gunawardena Hettiarachchi as Doctor
 Buddhi Wickrama

Awards

References

External links
 

2000s Sinhala-language films
2000 films
Films directed by Udayakantha Warnasuriya